Tihomir Petković is a politician in Serbia. He served three terms as the mayor of Užice and has been a member of the National Assembly of Serbia since 2020. Formerly a prominent local figure in the Democratic Party of Serbia (Demokratska stranka Srbije, DSS), Petković has been a member of the Serbian Progressive Party (Srpska napredna stranka, SNS) since 2013.

Private career
Petković graduated from the University of Belgrade Faculty of Economics in 1983. He subsequently managed the private trading company Gradina and worked for NIS Jugopetrol.

Politician

Municipal
Petković appeared in the third position on the DSS's electoral list for the Užice municipal assembly in the 2004 Serbian local elections and was given a mandate after the list won seven seats. Two years later, he was elected as mayor of the municipality in a by-election. At the time, mayors in Serbia were chosen by direct election; Petković defeated a candidate from a coalition led by the rival Democratic Party (Demokratska stranka, DS) in the second round of voting and served as mayor for the next two years. Concurrently, he was also one of Serbia's delegates to the Chamber of Local Authorities in the Congress of Local and Regional Authorities in the Council of Europe.

Serbia changed its municipal election laws prior to the 2008 local elections, such that mayors were selected by local assemblies rather being directly elected. Petković led the DSS coalition list for Užice in this electoral cycle and was re-elected to the assembly when the list won seventeen mandates. The election was won by the DS and its allies, and Petković stood down as mayor. He again led the DSS list for the 2012 local elections and was re-elected when the list won seven mandates.

Petković left the DSS in 2013 and joined the Progressive Party. He was appointed to a second term as mayor of the city the following year, after the resignation of Saša Milošević. He led the Progressive list in the 2016 local elections and continued as mayor after the list won a majority victory. 

On returning to the mayor's office in 2014, Petković identified the city's water supply as his primary concern; in September 2016, he announced the beginning of a major reconstruction project of the city's drinking water facility. He did not seek re-election at the local level in 2020.

Parliamentarian
Petković appeared in the seventy-first position on the DSS list in 2012 Serbian parliamentary election. The list won twenty-one mandates, and he was not returned.

He received the 142nd position on the Progressive Party's Aleksandar Vučić — For Our Children list in the 2020 parliamentary election and was elected to the national assembly when the list won a landslide majority with 188 mandates. He is now a member of the assembly's foreign affairs committee and the committee on the economy, regional development, trade, tourism, and energy, and a member of Serbia's parliamentary friendship groups with Austria, Belarus, Italy, Japan, Kazakhstan, and Russia.

Electoral record

Municipal

References

1958 births
Living people
Politicians from Užice
Mayors of places in Serbia
Members of the National Assembly (Serbia)
Members of the Chamber of Local Authorities in the Congress of Local and Regional Authorities of the Council of Europe
Democratic Party of Serbia politicians
Serbian Progressive Party politicians